Zauclophora muscerdella is a moth in the family Xyloryctidae. It was described by Zeller in 1873. It is found in Venezuela.

References

Zauclophora
Moths described in 1873